Norma Cossetto (17 May 1920 – 4/5 October 1943) was an Istrian Italian student, killed by the Yugoslavian communists and thrown into a foiba.

Life

The Cossetto family lived in the hamlet of Santa Domenica in Visinada (today Vižinada, Croatia), where Norma was born in 1920. Her father, Giuseppe, was a local leader of the Fascist National Party: he had held several posts and also served as podestà (mayor) of Visinada. He enlisted to the Voluntary Militia for National Security and, after the Armistice between Italy and the Allies was made public on 8 September 1943, he was deployed to Trieste.

Norma had attended the Regio Liceo Vittorio Emanuele III in Gorizia; after her graduation, she enrolled at the University of Padova and studied Italian Literature, while also joining the Fascist University Group in Pola. Since 1941, she had worked as a substitute teacher in Pisino and Parenzo. During the summer of 1943, she was writing her degree thesis, Istria rossa ("Red Istria", in reference to the rich ores of reddish bauxite in Istria), and she would tour the surrounding villages and parsonages with her cycle in order to collect information about her dissertation.

Capture and assassination
As later testified by Licia Cossetto, Norma's sister, their family began to receive threats after the 8 September Armistice; on the 25 September, their home was plundered by Yugoslavian and Italian resistance fighters. The following day, Norma was summoned at the resistance headquarters, stationed in the former Carabinieri barracks in Visignano. She was instructed to join the resistance movement, but she bluntly declined such an invitation; on the other hand, Giacomo Scotti reports, without sourcing his claim, that Cossetto refused to deny her allegiance to Fascism. However, one of her keepers decreed to let her go.

On the 27 September, she was detained again and brought to the former Guardia di Finanza barracks in Parenzo, with some relatives and friends. Her sister Licia arrived and tried to sue her release, but to no avail. As the Germans occupied Visinada after a few days, the resistance transferred the prisoners in the school in Antignana. In the school, Cossetto was kept apart from the other prisoners, tied to a table, and repeatedly tortured and raped by her captors. This was later reported to Licia Cossetto by a woman who lived in front of the school. Between 4 and 5 October, the prisoners were bound with wire, forcibly walked to Villa Surani, and thrown in the nearby foiba. The three female prisoners were again raped on the spot before they were thrown in the foiba. After a few days, Licia Cossetto was arrested by the resistance and invited to join their movement; just like her sister, she refused. One of the fighters, an acquaintance of Licia, pleaded for her release. The foiba where Norma was thrown is near Pirano in what is now Slovenian Istria. Other foibe were found nearby, with hundreds of corpses (including those of Albina, Caterina and Fosca Radecchi, and Amalia Ardossi), both Italians and non, fascists and antifascists.

After the Second World War, Cossetto's death has been considered emblematic of Foibe massacres and ethnic cleansings of Italians by Yugoslavs in Istria. In 1949, the University of Padova conferred to her the laurea "honorary" and in 2005 the Italian President Ciampi awarded her the "Medaglia d'oro al merito civile". In February 2010 she was commemorated during the National Memorial Day of the Exiles and Foibe. In July 2011, the cities of Trieste and Narni (Terni) dedicated streets to her memory, followed by Rome in 2015.

See also
 
 List of kidnappings

Notes

Bibliography
 Arrigo Petacco, L'esodo. La tragedia negata degli italiani d'Istria, Dalmazia e Venezia Giulia, Milano, Mondadori, 1999, .
 Frediano Sessi, Foibe rosse. Vita di Norma Cossetto uccisa in Istria nel '43, Venezia, Marsilio, 2007, .

1920 births
1943 deaths
1940s missing person cases
1943 crimes
1943 in Yugoslavia
Female murder victims
History of Istria
Italian torture victims
Italian murder victims
Missing person cases in Yugoslavia
Kidnapped people
Murder in Yugoslavia